Grace Boachie is a Ghanaian politician and a member of the second Parliament of the Fourth Republic representing the Tano South Constituency in the Brong Ahafo region of Ghana.

Early life 
Grace Boachie was born in Tano South in the Brong Ahafo region of Ghana.

Politics 
Boachie was first elected into the Parliament on the ticket of the National democratic congress for the Tano South Constituency in the Brong Ahafo Region of Ghana. She polled 13,390 votes out of the 24,879 valid votes cast representing 39.50% over her opponents Rex Ofori-Agyeman who polled 9,568 votes representing 28.20%, Godfred Kwaku Oppong who polled 1,267 votes representing 3.705, Osman Asante-Bonsu who polled 330 votes representing 1.00% and Daniel Kofi Nti who polled 324 votes representing 1.00%.

Career 
Grace Boachie is a former member of Parliament for the Tano South Constituency in the Brong Ahafo Region of Ghana.

References 

Living people
National Democratic Congress (Ghana) politicians
People from Brong-Ahafo Region
Government ministers of Ghana
21st-century Ghanaian politicians
Year of birth missing (living people)